Anthony Wilding defeated Francis Fisher, 6–0, 6–4, 6–4, in the final to win the men's singles tennis title at the 1906 Australasian Championships. This event (now known as the Australian Open) was a tennis tournament played on twelve grass courts in Hagley Park in Christchurch, New Zealand. The tournament, part of the Grand Slam, was held from 26 to 31 December.

Main draw

Draw

References

External links
 

1906 in Australian tennis
Men's Singles